Juuso Vainio, (born September 6, 1994) is a Finnish professional ice hockey player. He is currently playing for HC Fribourg-Gottéron of the Swiss National League (NL). 

Vainio made his Liiga debut playing with HPK during the 2012–13 Liiga season.

Awards and honours

References

External links

1994 births
Living people
HC Fribourg-Gottéron players
JYP Jyväskylä players
HPK players
Espoo Blues players
Finnish ice hockey defencemen
People from Hämeenlinna
Sportspeople from Kanta-Häme
Växjö Lakers players